Pascale Crozon (born 20 May 1944 in Morillon, Haute-Savoie) was a member of the National Assembly of France.  She represented the Rhône department,  and was a member of the Socialiste, radical, citoyen et divers gauche.

References

1944 births
Living people
People from Haute-Savoie
Socialist Party (France) politicians
Women members of the National Assembly (France)
Deputies of the 13th National Assembly of the French Fifth Republic
Deputies of the 14th National Assembly of the French Fifth Republic
21st-century French women politicians
Members of Parliament for Rhône